Notre Dame Academy is a private, all-girls, college-preparatory Catholic school in Worcester, Massachusetts. The school is operated by the Roman Catholic Diocese of Worcester, and is the only all-girls, college-preparatory school in Central Massachusetts.

History
In 1950, the Sisters of Notre Dame de Namur were asked to establish an all-girls academy in Worcester. A year later, Notre Dame Academy was established within the Knollwood site. The school constructed an academic building in 1955, the same year of its first graduating class. Knollwood was listed on the National Register of Historic Places in 1980.

The Notre Dame Academy campus did not expand significantly until 1990, when an art and athletic complex was constructed. Three years later, the Sister Justina Daley Library was established. In 2009, the academic building was renovated and enlarged. In 2011, Heritage Chapel opened, and in 2014, the Gage House had a major renovation.

Athletics
Home of the Rebels, Notre Dame Academy teams don the colors of green and gold. The school offers sports in three seasonal categories: Fall, Winter, and Spring. Fall athletics include cross country, field hockey, soccer, and volleyball. Winter includes basketball, ice hockey, and track and field. The Spring season includes golf, lacrosse, tennis, softball, and track and field.

Notable alumni
Jennifer Callahan, politician

See also
List of girls' schools in the United States
List of high schools in Massachusetts

References

External links

Official Website

Girls' schools in Massachusetts
Catholic secondary schools in Massachusetts
Educational institutions established in 1951
High schools in Worcester, Massachusetts
1951 establishments in Massachusetts
Sisters of Notre Dame de Namur schools